Louis de Nogaret de La Valette (8 February 1593, in Angoulême – 28 September 1639, in Rivoli) was a Roman Catholic cardinal and lieutenant general in the French Army.

Louis was the third son of Jean Louis de Nogaret de La Valette (1554–1642) and Marguerite de Foix-Candale.

As early as age 6, he received the abbey of Grandselve. In 1611, he left this abbey to François de Joyeuse and became Archbishop of Toulouse in his place. He also became Grand Almoner of France of King Louis XIII of France.

In 1621, Pope Paul V made him cardinal-deacon of Sant'Adriano al Foro.

Louis also was the commander of an army in the Thirty Years' War, commanding a French detachment alongside the army of Bernard of Saxe-Weimar in the summer of 1635. Together, they took Bingen, lifted the Sieges of Zweibrücken and Mainz, and withdrew the army from Mainz back to Lorraine after desertion sapped it of two-thirds of its men. 

Cardinal de La Valette served in the war under Cardinal Richelieu, which earned him the nickname of cardinal valet (servant cardinal).

Notes

References 
Wilson, Peter H. (2011). The Thirty Years War: Europe's Tragedy, Harvard University Press.

External links

 Louis de Nogaret de La Valette by S. Miranda (Florida International University, last updated September 2012)

1593 births
1639 deaths
17th-century French cardinals
Archbishops of Toulouse
People from Angoulême
French people of the Thirty Years' War